Sergei Serchenkov may refer to:

 Sergei Serchenkov (footballer, born 1969), Russian football player
 Sergei Serchenkov (footballer, born 1997), Russian football player